WMOV is a News/Talk/Sports formatted broadcast radio station licensed to Ravenswood, West Virginia, serving Ravenswood and Ripley in Jackson County, West Virginia.  WMOV is owned and operated by Vandalia Media Partners, LLC. The station is unrelated to Norfolk, Virginia’s WMOV-FM "MOViN' 107-7", owned by iHeartMedia.

External links
AM1360 and FM106-7 WMOV Online

MOV
Radio stations established in 1958
1958 establishments in West Virginia
MOV